Thomas Frank Gailor (September 17, 1856 – October 3, 1935) was the third bishop of the Episcopal Diocese of Tennessee in the Episcopal Church and served from 1898 to 1935.

Career
Gailor was enrolled in the preparatory department of, then graduated Bachelor of Arts from, Racine College in Wisconsin.  Bishop Charles Todd Quintard of Tennessee was an ardent supporter of Racine and its brilliant Rector, the Reverend James DeKoven (1831-1879).  Racine was modeled on both the College of St. James's in Maryland (founded 1842) and St. Peter's College, Radley, UK (founded 1847).  Both had reputations as outstanding schools.  St. James's and Racine were inspired by the scholarly philosophy and practice of William Augustus Muhlenberg (1796-1877), founder of two model schools on Long Island in 1828 and 1836.  Muhlenberg is considered by some as the father of the Church school movement in America, an energy which gave rise to some of the elite college preparatory schools in the United States. Gailor taught at the University of the South in Sewanee, Tennessee and went on to serve as Vice-Chancellor (President) of the institution; then, after his election to the episcopate, served as the eighth Chancellor of the University (June 23, 1908, until his death). In 1916 Gailor was elected president of the House of Bishops, and at the 1919 General Convention he was elected president of the National Council of the Episcopal Church. He served in this position until 1925, when the Episcopal Church's first elected presiding bishop began his six-year term.

In 1921 he received an honorary degree in Doctor of Laws from Oglethorpe University.

On June 25, 1924, he offered the invocation at the opening of the second day of the 1924 Democratic National Convention.

He died in Sewanee on October 3, 1935.

Family
In 1923, his daughter, Ellen Douglas Gailor, married Richard Folsom Cleveland, son of former President Grover Cleveland.

See also
Episcopal Diocese of West Tennessee
Episcopal Diocese of East Tennessee
Succession of Bishops of The Episcopal Church (U.S.)
St. Mary's Episcopal Cathedral in Memphis

References

Sources
 "Thomas Frank Gailor," Tennessee Encyclopedia of History and Culture
 Bibliographic directory from Project Canterbury
 William Stevens Perry, "Thomas Frank Gailor," The Episcopate in America (Christian Literature Company, 1895), p. 357.

Heads of universities and colleges in the United States
1856 births
1935 deaths
People from Jackson, Mississippi
People from Tennessee
Racine College alumni
Episcopal bishops of Tennessee